Fire in the Night may refer to:

 Fire in the Night (1955 film)
 Fire in the Night (2013 film)